Atelopus bomolochos, the Azuay stubfoot toad or Cuenca jambato frog, is a species of toad in the family Bufonidae. It is endemic to southern Ecuador and known from Cordillera Oriental in the Azuay, Cañar, and Loja Provinces.

Description
Males measure  and females  in snout–vent length. The dorsum is yellow, yellow with brown, or yellowish green, usually with black spots on the back. The belly is yellow or orange.

Habitat and conservation
It breeds in streams.

This formerly abundant species has nearly disappeared from its range. The decline is attributed to chytridiomycosis and habitat loss. After one last individual was observed in 2002 in the Sangay National Park, and the species was feared extinct, the species was not seen before a small population was rediscovered in 2015 near Cuenca.

A captive population is maintained in the Amaru Zoo, Cuenca.

References

bomolochos
Amphibians of the Andes
Amphibians of Ecuador
Endemic fauna of Ecuador
Amphibians described in 1973
Taxa named by James A. Peters
Taxonomy articles created by Polbot